Jean Curthoys (born 1947) is an Australian feminist philosopher.

She was born in Broken Hill, New South Wales, the daughter of Geoffrey and Barbara Curthoys, leading members of the Communist Party of Australia. Her sister Ann Curthoys is an academic historian. After studying science and philosophy at the University of Sydney, she helped teach the first feminist philosophy course in Sydney in 1973. Her 1997 book, Feminist Amnesia, accuses later academic feminist theory of abandoning the liberation theory of the 1960s for an intellectually and morally sterile careerism.

She is a contributor to Goodbye to All That? On the Failure of Neo-liberalism and the Urgency of Change, ed. D. McKnight and R. Manne (Black Inc, 2010). She saw through the press and wrote an introduction to Vic Dudman's work on the priority of grammar over logic, Victor Dudman's Grammar and Semantics (Palgrave Macmillan, 2012).

She was married to philosopher Alan Olding and later to photographer and historian John Williams.

References

External links
 Australian Screen brief video clip on her educational expectations
 National Film and Sound Archive recollection of seeing feminist speaker abused
 J. Franklin, (2003), Corrupting the Youth: A History of Philosophy in Australia, Macleay Press, ch. 14

1947 births
University of Sydney alumni
Academic staff of the University of Sydney
People from Newcastle, New South Wales
Australian women philosophers
Australian philosophers
Feminist philosophers
Living people